Tony Salerno is an American voice actor, ADR director and scriptwriter who has worked with 4Kids Entertainment, Central Park Media and TAJ Productions. He often works as actor or staff crew on anime dubs.

Voice credits

Anime
Jungle Emperor Leo - Mac
Ikki Tousen: Dragon Destiny - Jyokou Koumei
Kujibiki Unbalance - Mugio Rokuhara, Yuuya Kaburaki, Rebel B
Now and Then, Here and There - Kazam, Doctor, Additional Voices
Magical DoReMi - Dr. Pierce
Maetel Legend - Additional Voices
Ping-Pong Club - Narrator, Shibazaki, Minamida, Akiko
Revolutionary Girl Utena - Additional Voices
Shura no Toki - Age of Chaos - Narrator
Slayers Next - Demons, King Moros
Slayers Try - Additional Voices
The Irresponsible Captain Tylor - Bunta, Charly, Jason (Ep. 5) 
Yu-Gi-Oh! (series)
Yu-Gi-Oh! - Rex Raptor (Dinosaur Ryuzaki) (Ep. 188-224)
Yu-Gi-Oh! GX - Chazz Princeton - (Jun Manjoume) (Ep. 1-89), Lorenzo
Yu-Gi-Oh! 5D's - Lenny, Haley
Yu-Gi-Oh! ZEXAL 2 - Alito

Non-anime
G.I. Joe: Sigma 6 - General Hawk
Teenage Mutant Ninja Turtles - Nano
Turtles Forever - '87 Donatello, Additional Voices
Viva Pinata - Dr. Sweetooth
Winx Club (4Kids Entertainment edit) - Additional Voices

Video games
Spyro the Dragon - Laser Gnorc, Jacques
Shaman King: Master of Spirits - Magister
Shaman King: Master of Spirits 2 - Magister
Yu-Gi-Oh! Duel Links - Rex Raptor
Reservoir Dogs 2 - Mr. Punk
Sonic Unleashed - Chip

Production credits

Dubbing supervisor
Adventure Kid
Area 88 (OVA)
Art of Fighting
Ayane's High Kick
Battle Arena Toshinden
Battle Skipper
Big Wars
Cybernetics Guardian
Grave of the Fireflies
Harlock Saga
Heroic Legend of Arslan (Part 2)
Iria: Zeiram the Animation
Legend of Lemnear
M.D. Geist 
My My Mai
The Silent Service
Slayers
Spirit Warrior
Strange Love 
Takegami: Guardian of Darkness
They Were 11 
Twin Angels
Urotsukidōji IV: Inferno Road
Urusei Yatsura 2: Beautiful Dreamer 
Venus 5
Voltage Fighter Gowcaizer
Wrath of the Ninja
YuYu Hakusho: Poltergeist Report

Voice direction
The Irresponsible Captain Tylor
Maetel Legend
Now and Then, Here and There
Ping Pong Club
Pokémon (Season 2)
Pokémon Chronicles
Revolutionary Girl Utena
Shaman King
Shura no Toki: Age of Chaos
Slayers (Seasons 2-3)
Winx Club (Seasons 1-2)
Cubix: Robots for Everyone (Seasons 1-2)
Magical DoReMi (Seasons 1-2)
Harlock Saga

Script adaptation
The Irresponsible Captain Tylor
Maetel Legend
Now and Then, Here and There
Ping Pong Club
Revolutionary Girl Utena
Slayers (Seasons 2-3)

External links
Official Website

Tony Salerno at Crystal Acids

Living people
American television writers
American male screenwriters
American male television writers
American voice directors
American writers of Italian descent
American male voice actors
American film directors
American male video game actors
Year of birth missing (living people)
American people of Italian descent